Gaston Sindimwo (born 1965) is a Burundian politician who served as 1st Vice President of Burundi from 2015 to 2020. He is also the Secretary General of the Union for National Progress (UPRONA). Sindimwo previously served as Deputy Chief of Staff to the First Vice President.

He unsuccessfully ran for President of Burundi in the 2020 Burundian general election, finishing third of seven candidates.

References

1965 births
Living people
Vice-presidents of Burundi
Union for National Progress politicians
People from Bujumbura